Naraynapur is a village in Rangareddy district in Andhra Pradesh, India. It falls under Shamirpet mandal.

References

Villages in Ranga Reddy district